Domenico Bologna (born in Turin August 22, 1845 – 1885) was an Italian painter, mainly of landscapes with figures.

He trained under professors Antonio Fontanesi and Francesco Gamba in Accademia Albertina. Among his works are: Dopo Vespro, exhibited in 1875 at Milan; Tramonto, exhibited in 1881 at Milan; Il Tanaro, bought by the Società promotrice of Fine Arts in Genoa; Le sponde del Po at Turin, sold in 1878 at St Petersburg, Russia, Le sponde del Tanaro; Inverno ; Pascolo; and  Tramonto, exhibited in 1883 at Rome.

References

1845 births
1885 deaths
19th-century Italian painters
Italian male painters
Italian landscape painters
Painters from Turin
19th-century Italian male artists